Hanna Herzog is a professor of sociology at the Department of Sociology and Anthropology at Tel Aviv University  and a senior research fellow and the academic director of the Civil Society forums at Van Leer Jerusalem Institute in
Jerusalem.

Academic career
She is among the founders of Woman and Gender Studies in Israel which has been in existence since 2000. She specializes in political sociology, political communication, and sociology of gender. She has published many articles on politics. These consist mainly of ethnic and racial relations and women in politics, Palestinian women citizens of Israel, and gender, religion and
politics.

Political activism
She has been active in the public sphere in political lobbying, and in the struggle
against gender discrimination. She has been a member and board member of the Israel
Women's Network (INW); headed the steering committee of the Research and
Information Center of the INW; is much in demand as a lecturer and advisor for
various women's organizations; is a member of the public forum for the advancement
of the status of women in science and academe; is active in the peace movement;
served on the public council to examine the structure of the regime in Israel
established by the President of Israel; is a member of the council to define military
service for women in Israel (2007).

Hanna Herzog has concentrated on the connection between society and politics in
Israel with special emphasis on minority groups striving for equality and full
integration. She uses the research and academic tools with which she is familiar to
advance the academic and political dialog between Jewish and Palestinian-Arab
women in Israel.

Published works

Books
Herzog is the author of numerous books and articles, including:

 Political Ethnicity - The Image and the Reality, 1986 (Hebrew)
 Realistic Women - Women in Israeli Local Politics, 1994 (Hebrew)
Gendering Politics - Women in Israel, University of Michigan Press, 1999
Sex Gender Politics - Women in Israel (Written with others) 1999 (Hebrew).

Herzog headed the Sociology Department of Tel Aviv University, headed the Society and
Politics Section at the Tel Aviv-Yafo Academic College from its inception in 1994 –
2001). She served as the president of the (International) Association for Israel Studies
(1999–2001), as the editor of the academic journal Israeli Sociology (2001–2005). She
is as member of the editorial boards of the academic journals in Hebrew and
international academic journals.

Articles

See also
Women in Israel

References 

Feminist studies scholars
Gender studies academics
Israeli sociologists
Israeli women sociologists
Academic staff of Tel Aviv University
Living people
Israeli feminists
Year of birth missing (living people)